Herbert Corthell (born Joseph Bertram Corthell, January 20, 1878 – January 23, 1947) was an American stage and film actor. He was born in Boston, Massachusetts, and died in Hollywood, California.

Filmography

References

External links

1878 births
1947 deaths
20th-century American male actors
American male film actors
American male stage actors
Male actors from Boston
Burials at Forest Lawn Memorial Park (Glendale)